Roger Tangri (born in Glasgow, Scotland in 1941) is a British as well as United States citizen. He is a political scientist and Africanist with an expertise in the politics of Ghana and Uganda.

Tangri has previously taught at the University of Botswana, the Institute of Social Studies, The Hague, The Netherlands, the US Foreign Service Institute, the University of Maryland, College Park, the School of International Service at the American University, Makerere University, Kampala, Uganda, the National University of Lesotho, the University of Ghana, the American University in Cairo, the University of Malawi, the University of Zambia, the University of Sierra Leone, the University of Manchester, England, and the University of Nairobi.

Selected works
 "The Politics of Elite Corruption in Africa. Uganda in Comparative Perspective", Routledge, 2013.
 The Politics of Patronage in Africa. Parastatals, Privatization, and Private Enterprise, James Currey, Oxford 1999
 Politics in Sub-Saharan Africa, James Currey, Oxford 1985
 With Andrew Mwenda, Politics, Donors, and the Ineffectiveness of Anti-Corruption Institutions in Uganda, 2006, Journal of Modern African Studies. 
 With Andrew Mwenda, Patronage Politics, Donor Reforms, and Regime Consolidation in Uganda, 2005, African Affairs
 With Andrew Mwenda, Military Corruption and Uganda Politics Since the Late 1990s'', 2003, Review of African Political Economy

References

External links
 Die Weltwoche article 

1941 births
Living people
British political scientists
University of Maryland, College Park faculty
Academic staff of The American University in Cairo
Academic staff of the University of Zambia
Academic staff of the University of Malawi
British expatriate academics in the United States
American University faculty and staff
Academic staff of the University of Ghana
Academics of the University of Manchester
Academic staff of the University of Botswana